Sunshine Coast railway line, Queensland may refer to:

Maroochydore railway line - proposed Queensland Rail railway line from Beerwah to Maroochydore
Nambour and Gympie North railway line - current Queensland Rail railway line from Brisbane to Gympie North